Josef Smistik (28 November 1905 – 28 November 1985) was an Austrian football player and manager. Smistik played mainly in midfield as a wing half but could also play as a defender. A very versatile player Smistik was known for his strength, stamina and long balls. He was captain of the famous Austrian Wunderteam at international level.

At club level, he played for Rapid Wien, ESV Stadlau, FAC and Kremser SC.

He later coached FC Schaffhausen and Austria Wien.

References

External links
Profile
Profile

1905 births
1985 deaths
Austrian footballers
Austria international footballers
SK Rapid Wien players
1934 FIFA World Cup players
Austrian football managers
FK Austria Wien managers
Association football midfielders